Sàndro Gòrli (born 19 June 1948 in Como) – Italian composer, conductor, teacher.
The author of "Requiem" for mixed choir a Cappella, written specially for the well-known choir La Chapelle Royale.
This composition was included in the Treasury of choral authentic music.
From 1990 to 1998 – the principal conductor of the ELISION Ensemble in Melbourne (Australia).

Biography

Youth 
Sandro Gorli was born in the Italian city of Como on 19 June 1948.
Admiring the beautiful views of this small Italian town Sandro Gorli decided to practice architecture.
He entered and graduated from a University course in architecture in Milan, but the thirst for music was stronger.
So he was studying composition with the renowned Italian composer and teacher Franco Donatoni, which, in particular, 
was a teacher of modern Finnish composer and conductor Esa-Pekka Salonen.
As a result, he received higher education in music – composition class, and piano class.

Sandro Gorli also conducts research in the field of phonology and cooperates with Phonology Studio at the Radiotelevision of Italy (RAI) in Milan.
In the process of its work on the RAI he meets with musicians from the RAI National Symphony Orchestra and he liked conduct the orchestra. First Sandro Gorli studying this art directly in Milan, then at the invitation of Hans Swarowsky he moved to Vienna and becomes highly skilled conductor.

Sandro Gorli reveals himself organizational skills in 1977 and establishes still existing "Divertimento" Ensemble.
The purpose of this group is the promotion of contemporary music, especially classical music in the style of modernism.

Performing arts 
Since 1990 Sandro Gorli has carried out the role of a conductor working tirelessly with two teams – the "Divertimento" ensemble and ELISION Ensemble. Also him accompanies success in work on the invitation. He conducted the "Orchestra Sinfonica Siciliana" in Palermo (premiere "Low Simphony" by Philip Glass), he makes recording music by Bruno Maderna with "Orchestra Sinfonica di Milano Giuseppe Verdi". 

To date, Sandro Gorli already recorded more than 14 full-length CDs with music from classical to modernism, in the genre of which he excelled himself.

Composition 
Sandro Gorli is one of the few contemporary composers that have large orders, in particular, 
he was commissioned to write music by Milan Radiotelevision (RAI,1973), French Ministry of Culture (1979, 1983, 1984, 1989, 1994), The Italian foreign Ministry (1987), Radio France (1981 and 1988) and other prominent customers.

Among the recognized creations Sandro Gorli includes:

 "Me – Ti", by order of Bruno Maderna for the RAI National Symphony Orchestra of radio and television in Milan
 "Chimera la luce" for the vocal sextet, piano, chorus and orchestra
 "Il bambino perduto" for orchestra
 String Quartet
 "Super flumina" for oboe, viola and orchestra
 "Le due sorgenti" for chamber orchestra
 "Requiem" in memory of Nathalia Mefano for authentic chorus La Chapelle Royale
 Opera "Solo"
 Opera "Le mal de lune" (debuted in Colmar and Strasbourg in 1994)

Award 
 European Award 1985 for the Opera "Solo" for musical theatre

Links 
 Biography of Sandro Gorli
 Music Events online, Listen, Comment, Compose
 ELISION Ensemble

Notes

1948 births
Living people
Italian classical composers
Italian male classical composers
Italian male conductors (music)
20th-century classical composers
People from Como
20th-century Italian composers
Italian male pianists
20th-century Italian conductors (music)
21st-century Italian conductors (music)
21st-century Italian male musicians
21st-century pianists
20th-century Italian male musicians